José Andres Blanco Sánchez (born 13 April 1958 in Madrid) is a cyclist from Spain.  He has a disability: He is a type LC3 cyclist. He competed at the 2000 Summer Paralympics.  He finished second in the Individual Pursuit track LC3 race. He finished third in the Road LC3 race.

References

External links 
 
 

1958 births
Living people
Spanish male cyclists
Paralympic cyclists of Spain
Paralympic silver medalists for Spain
Paralympic bronze medalists for Spain
Paralympic medalists in cycling
Cyclists at the 2000 Summer Paralympics
Medalists at the 2000 Summer Paralympics
Cyclists from Madrid